Rhombodera morokana is a species of praying mantises in the family Mantidae, found on the island of New Guinea.

See also
List of mantis genera and species

References

M
Mantodea of Asia
Insects described in 1912